Mazra may refer to:
Mazra, Armenia (disambiguation)
 Katnarrat, Syunik, Armenia
 Mets Masrik, Armenia
 Mutsk, Armenia
 Pokr Masrik, Armenia
Mazra, Azerbaijan (disambiguation)
 Məzrə, Babek, Azerbaijan
 Məzrə, Jabrayil, Azerbaijan
 Məzrə, Ordubad, Azerbaijan
 Məzrə, Qubadli, Azerbaijan
 Mazrali, Azerbaijan
Mazra, Iran (disambiguation)
Mazra, Ahar, East Azerbaijan Province, Iran
Mazra, Shabestar, East Azerbaijan Province, Iran
Mazra, Varzaqan, East Azerbaijan Province, Iran
Mazra, Hamadan, Iran
Mazra, Markazi, Iran
Mazra'a, Israel
Mazra, Turkey, a historical Assyrian hamlet in the village of Tkhuma